The Dominguez Canyon Wilderness is a U.S. Wilderness Area located southeast of Grand Junction in western Colorado.  The  wilderness area established in 2009, the largest BLM roadless area in the state of Colorado, includes two major canyon systems that drain the northeastern corner of the Uncompahgre Plateau.  The Wilderness Area is a portion of the larger Dominguez-Escalante National Conservation Area,  in size.

References

Wilderness areas of Colorado
Protected areas established in 2009
Protected areas of Mesa County, Colorado
Protected areas of Delta County, Colorado
Bureau of Land Management areas in Colorado
2009 establishments in Colorado